Mafia Inc. is a 2019 Canadian crime drama film directed by Podz and scripted by Sylvain Guy. Based on the non-fiction book Mafia Inc: The Long, Bloody Reign of Canada's Sicilian Clan by journalists André Cédilot and André Noël, the film stars Marc-André Grondin as Vincent Gamache, a man who gets drawn into Montreal's organized crime underground through his friendship with Giaco Paterno, the son of a major mafia boss. The cast also includes Sergio Castellitto, Gilbert Sicotte, Mylène Mackay, Tony Nardi and Benz Antoine.

The film premiered in October 2019 at the São Paulo International Film Festival, before having its Canadian premiere in February 2020. Grondin received a Canadian Screen Award nomination for Best Actor at the 8th Canadian Screen Awards.

Plot summary
The Gamache, a family of tailors, have been dressing the Paternò Mafia family for three generations. Vincent “Vince” Gamache works on behalf of Frank, the godfather with his eldest son Giaco. Vince, reckless and rash, seeks to earn his stripes by impressing the godfather. Without the Paternò knowing, he stages a big operation and is promoted. Fuming with jealousy, Giaco discovers that Vince committed a monstrous act behind his back. The Gamache disown him and war begins.

Cast

Production
In February 2018 the Quebecor Fund granted $380,000 to support the production of Mafia Inc. and Antigone by Sophie Deraspe (to be divided between the two films). In May 2018 Telefilm Canada announced it would spend approximately $13 million to fund 10 Quebec films, including Mafia Inc. Principal photography took place in Montreal and then Cuba before completing late in 2018.

Reception

Critical response 

According to Metacritic, which sampled six critics and calculated a weighted average score of 64 out of 100, the film received "generally favorable reviews".

Accolades

References

External links
 

2019 films
Canadian crime drama films
Films directed by Daniel Grou
Films shot in Cuba
Films shot in Montreal
Films set in Montreal
Mafia films
Films about organized crime in Canada
French-language Canadian films
2010s Canadian films
Canadian gangster films